Härjedalen (or )  is a historical province (landskap) in the centre of Sweden. It borders the Norwegian county of Trøndelag as well as the provinces of Dalarna, Hälsingland, Medelpad, and Jämtland.  The province originally belonged to Norway, but was ceded to Sweden in the Treaty of Brömsebro, 1645. The province forms the bulk of Härjedalen Municipality, of which the village of Sveg is the seat.

Etymology

The name Härjedalen, from Old West Norse , literally means the "Valley of the Härje river". A Latinized transliteration is Herdalia, although that name is hardly encountered in the English language today. More prominent are derivations such as Herjedalen or Haerjedalen. The more prosaic explanation of the name says that the word her or har just means "mound of stones" and refers to stones in the river .

History 
Jämtland and Härjedalen were provinces of Denmark-Norway until the mid-17th century.  After the Treaty of Brömsebro in 1645,  Härjedalen, along with Jämtland, were ceded to Sweden. 

The first population of Härjedalen is estimated to have migrated there circa 7,000 BC. The population lived from hunting and fishing, close to the inland ice which by then had started to melt. Ruändan, in the Flatruet mountains in northwestern Härjedalen, is the location of a large  site of rock paintings. The rock paintings at Ruändan consists of some twenty figures depicting people, bear, moose and reindeer. The rock paintings was first reported in 1896 and are estimated to be over 4000 years old.

According to legend, Härjedalen is named after a powerful Norseman who had to flee east from the Norwegian court of King Halfdan Svarte after killing one of the king's men with a horn. Thereafter he was known as Härjulf Hornbrytare (lit. "Härjulf the Hornbreaker"). For a time he entered the service of the Svea King Anund, until he eloped with that king's sister, Helga, and together they disappeared into the remote location in the region eventually named after him. Today a statue stands dedicated to them in the village of Lillhärdal. Härjulf and Helga were the foreparents to the Icelander, Bjarni Herjólfsson, who was the first Norseman to see the "new world" when he was blown off-course whilst on a voyage to Greenland. His boat is the one Leif Erikson acquired about 15 years later for Leif's famed landing on Vinland.

Christianization of Härjedalen took place after the Battle of Stiklestad in 1030. Agriculture remained Härjedalen's largest industry for a long time, supplemented by ironmaking and trade mainly to Røros in Trøndelag.  Extensive forestry also played a major role in Härjedalen resulting of industrialization which occurred in the mid-1850s.
A large portion of Härjedalen residents emigrated to America, principally to Northwestern Minnesota during the late 1800s. More recently, Härjedalen has increasingly taken up the position as a tourist landscape with large mountain facilities in Funäsdalen, Vemdalen   and Lofsdalen.

Geography 

Four-fifths of the province is situated above 500 metres of altitude, constituting a part of the Scandinavian mountain range. Sweden's highest village Högvålen, at 835 metres, is also within the province.

Härjedalen does not have any cities at all. The only village of even modest size is the market town Sveg, which used to be the administrative centre of the province.

The provincial flower is the Arctic violet. It is prominent on high altitudes in Europe, and is also found in the Alps.

Sånfjället National Park extends through the municipality.

Administration 

The traditional provinces of Sweden serve no current administrative or political purposes, but are historical and cultural entities. In the case of Härjedalen there is a municipality, kommun, Härjedalen Municipality, which is located in the southern part of Jämtland County. The municipality does not exactly correspond to the province, but is larger.

Subdivisions 
Härjedalen was historically divided into districts.

Hede Court District
Sveg Court District

Heraldry 
The arms is represented with a dukal coronet. Blazon: "Argent a Sledgehammer Sable with Core Gules between Tongs of the second and two Hammers adorsed in pale of the second handled Gules.". It was granted in 1660. Since 1974 Härjedalen Municipality uses the same coat of arms, but without the coronet.

Sports
Football in the province is administered by Jämtland-Härjedalens Fotbollförbund.

References

Other sources
Bergström-Magnusson-Raihle (1991)  Härjedalen - Natur och kulturhistoria (Östersund: Jämtlands läns museum)

External links 
 Municipality site  
 Härjedalens Culture Center  
Jämtland Härjedalen  Tourist site 
 Härjedalen map
Map of Härjedalen

 
Provinces of Sweden
Kingdom of Norway (872–1397)